The British Columbia Scotties Tournament of Hearts is the British Columbia provincial women's curling tournament. The tournament is run by Curl BC, the provincial curling association. The winning team represents British Columbia at the Scotties Tournament of Hearts.

Past winners
(National champions in bold)

References

External links
British Columbia Women's Champions

British Columbia
Curling in British Columbia